Wayne Johnston may refer to:

 Wayne Johnston (writer), Canadian novelist
 Wayne Johnston (footballer), former Australian rules footballer
 Wayne A. Johnston, president of Illinois Central Railroad in the mid-20th century